USS Oakland (LCS-24) is an  of the United States Navy. She is the third ship to be named for the City of Oakland, California.

Design
In 2002, the United States Navy initiated a program to develop the first of a fleet of littoral combat ships. The Navy initially ordered two trimaran hulled ships from General Dynamics, which became known as the  after the first ship of the class, . Even-numbered US Navy littoral combat ships are built using the Independence-class trimaran design, while odd-numbered ships are based on a competing design, the conventional monohull . The initial order of littoral combat ships involved a total of four ships, including two of the Independence-class design. On 29 December 2010, the Navy announced that it was awarding Austal USA a contract to build ten additional Independence-class littoral combat ships.

Construction and career 
Oakland was built by Austal USA in Mobile, Alabama. A ceremonial laying of the keel was held at the Austal USA shipyards in Mobile on 20 July 2018.  The ship was christened on 29 June 2019 and then launched on 21 July 2019.
She was delivered to the Navy on 26 June 2020, and was commissioned on 17 April 2021. The ship was in Honiara, Solomon Islands on 7 August 2022 for ceremonies marking the 80th anniversary of the Battle of Guadalcanal.

References

 

Independence-class littoral combat ships
2019 ships